Georg Kükenthal (30 March 1864 in Weißenfels – 20 October 1955 in Coburg) was a German pastor and botanist who specialized in the field of caricology. He was the brother of zoologist Willy Kükenthal (1861–1922).

From 1882 to 1885 he studied theology at the universities of Tübingen and Halle. He worked as a pastor in Grub am Forst, and later in Coburg. In 1913 he received an honorary degree from the University of Breslau.

Kükenthal was a leading authority on sedges. In his 1909 monograph, he divided the genus Carex into four subgenera: Primocarex, Vignea, Indocarex and Eucarex. Carex is the largest monophyletic (natural) genus of flowering plants; Kükenthal's monograph remains the only comprehensive, worldwide treatment.

Selected publications 
 Cyperaceae-Caricoideae, etc., in Adolf Engler's Das Pflanzenreich (1909) – On Cyperaceae-Caricoideae.
 Beiträge zur Flora von Coburg und Umgebung (1930) – Contributions to the flora of Coburg and surroundings.
 Cyperaceae-Scirpoideae-Cypereae, etc., in Das Pflanzenreich (1936) – On Cyperaceae-Scirpoideae-Cypereae.

See also
 :Category:Taxa named by Georg Kükenthal

References 
 Collectors of lichens and lichenicolous fungi of Germany (biographical information)
 Systematics of the Genus Carex by Anthony Darrouzet-Nardi· 5 May 2003
 Global Carex Group (2015) Making Carex monophyletic (Cyperaceae, tribe Cariceae): a new broader circumscription. Bot J Linn Soc, 179: 1–42. doi:10.1111/boj.12298

19th-century German botanists
1864 births
1955 deaths
University of Tübingen alumni
People from Weißenfels
University of Halle alumni
20th-century German botanists